The 1958 New Hampshire gubernatorial election was held on November 4, 1958. Republican nominee Wesley Powell defeated Democratic nominee Bernard L. Boutin with 51.65% of the vote.

Primary elections
Primary elections were held on September 9, 1958.

Candidates 
Bernard L. Boutin, Mayor of Laconia
John Shaw
Alfred J. Champagne
Albert R. Courtois

Results

Republican primary

Candidates
Wesley Powell, attorney
Hugh Gregg, former Governor
W. Douglas Scammon
Eralsey C. Ferguson
Elmer E. Bussey

Results

General election

Candidates
Wesley Powell, Republican
Bernard L. Boutin, Democratic

Results

References

1958
New Hampshire
Gubernatorial